Ingo Rademacher (born 22 April 1971) is a German-Australian television actor best known for his role of Jasper "Jax" Jacks on the American daytime soap opera General Hospital, which he played almost continuously from 1996 to 2021. In 2012, he played Officer Sacks in the film Alex Cross. Rademacher placed 5th on the 16th season of Dancing with the Stars in 2013.

Career
General Hospital producer Wendy Riche saw his (unsuccessful) audition tape for the soap opera The City and immediately cast him as suave tycoon Jasper "Jax" Jacks. a role he played from 1996 to 2013, and then on and off from 2016 to 2021. During a one-year break from General Hospital, Rademacher appeared on the short-lived 2000 primetime soap opera Titans. Jax reappeared on General Hospital on 23 August 2012. He returned to the show for a several-week-long story arc in 2016. That same year, he also had a recurring role as Robert Coughlin on Hawaii Five-0.

Rademacher was a contestant on the 16th season of Dancing with the Stars and was partnered with two-time champion Kym Johnson.

In September 2017, it was announced that Rademacher had joined the cast of The Bold and the Beautiful in the role of Thorne Forrester. He made his first appearance on 27 November 2017. In December 2018, Rademacher announced he had chosen to not renew his deal with the soap and would vacate the role. 

On 14 February 2019, he announced he was returning to General Hospital. On 8 November 2021, it was reported that Rademacher would be leaving General Hospital after refusing to comply with the production's vaccine mandate, and the following month he announced he was suing ABC over its vaccine mandate.

Personal life
Rademacher previously dated then-General Hospital co-star Rebecca Herbst in the late 1990s. In 2008, Rademacher and his then girlfriend Ehiku had a son. In 2009, Rademacher and Ehiku married, and they had another son together born in 2012. In February 2021, he announced the couple were expecting their third child. In June 2021, Rademacher and Ehiku welcomed a daughter.

Rademacher and his wife Ehiku own Mahiku, an activewear store in Hawaii.

Other
Rademacher sits on the board of Heal the Bay, a Santa Monica-based environmental organization.

Filmography

See also
 German Australian

References

External links
 

1971 births
20th-century Australian male actors
21st-century Australian male actors
Australian expatriate male actors in the United States
Australian male soap opera actors
German emigrants to Australia
Living people
Participants in American reality television series
People from Queensland